This article shows all participating team squads at the 2015 Women's NORCECA Volleyball Championship, held from 27 September 27 to 2 October, 2015 in Michoacan, Mexico.





The following is the Cuban roster in the 2015 NORCECA Championship.

Head coach: Roberto García











References

External links
 NORCECA

N
N